The Kazakh ambassador in Moscow is the official representative of the Government in Astana to the Government of Russia.

List of representatives

References 

 
Russia
Kazakhstan